Asmir Begović (born 20 June 1987) is a Bosnian professional footballer who plays as a goalkeeper for  club Everton.

Begović started his professional career with English club Portsmouth, signing for them in the summer of 2003. After a sequence of loans, he made his Premier League debut in May 2009 and was sold to Stoke City for £3.25 million in February 2010. In the 2012–13 season, he played  every  league match and won the club's Player of the Year award. In November 2013, Begović became the fifth goalkeeper to score a goal in the Premier League, scoring from 97.5 yards (89.15 meters) against Southampton after 13 seconds, also getting the World Record for 'longest goal scored in football'. In July 2015, he joined Premier League champions Chelsea for a fee of £8 million, remaining second-choice until his move to AFC Bournemouth two years later. After losing his place to Artur Boruc early in 2019, he was loaned to Qarabağ and A.C. Milan before signing for Everton.

Begović represented Canada at youth level playing for them at the 2007 FIFA U-20 World Cup. In 2009, he decided to change his allegiance and represent his native country, Bosnia and Herzegovina. He soon established himself as their number one goalkeeper and helped them qualify for the 2014 FIFA World Cup, their first major tournament.

Club career

Early career
Begović was born in Trebinje, Bosnia and Herzegovina, which was at the time part of Yugoslavia, to a Bosnian Muslim family. His father, Amir, was also a goalkeeper who played for Leotar and Iskra Bugojno whilst his mother, Ajnija, hails from Stolac. The Begović family fled the Bosnian War to Germany when Asmir was four years old, where he began to play organised football with local youth club FC Kirchhausen in Heilbronn. When he was 10, his family moved to Edmonton in Canada.

Begović attended the St. Francis Xavier High School where he played for their academy. He also played Minor League Soccer with the Southwest Sting Soccer Club in Edmonton which earned him a call-up to the Canada under-17 squad. In 2003, he earned a trial with Portsmouth and Tottenham Hotspur and his representatives paid for him to fly over to England. After two days with Portsmouth, coaches David Hurst and Mark O'Connor were suitably impressed and offered Begović a contract before his trial at Tottenham could begin.

Portsmouth
Begović signed a youth contract with Portsmouth in the summer of 2003 and due to him not having a European Union passport he spent two years on an education visa which prevented him from featuring in matches which involved money being taken on the gate. After playing for the youth team he then spent time on loan at La Louviere in Belgium in 2005 where he played twice in the Belgian top flight. Begović got his UK visa in the summer of 2006 which allowed him to sign on loan for Macclesfield Town in the 2006–07 season, making his Football League debut in a 1–1 draw at Stockport County on 25 November as an 80th minute substitute, after injury to first choice goalkeeper Jonny Brain. His loan spell was cut short, however, as he sustained a knee injury after making just three appearances. In August 2007, Begović was loaned to AFC Bournemouth in League One in a deal lasting until January 2008. He was recalled back from Bournemouth on 11 October 2007. On 8 December 2007, Begović was named in Portsmouth's 16-man matchday squad for the first time in a Premier League game in a match against Aston Villa as a substitute.

In March 2008, he signed for Yeovil Town on loan for a month with Portsmouth having the right to recall him back when they so desired. On 29 March Begović made his debut for Yeovil, keeping a clean sheet against Bristol Rovers. He was subsequently recalled after making two appearances despite Yeovil trying to re-sign him on an emergency loan. The "Glovers" manager Russell Slade revealed in June 2008 that he wanted to sign Begović on loan again after Steve Mildenhall joined Southend United. The move was delayed however due to his grandfather passing away. He rejoined Yeovil on loan, this time for three months in August 2008. He made 14 league appearances, keeping three clean sheets in a struggling Yeovil side.

Begović made his Portsmouth debut against Sunderland in their 3–1 win on 18 May 2009. Following his Premier League debut for Pompey Begović expressed his delight. "It was fantastic, to make your first Premier League appearance is something I've looked forward to for a long long time." He joined Championship team Ipswich Town on loan until 16 January 2010 in October. On 23 November Begović was recalled to Portsmouth due to David James being injured, ending his Ipswich Town loan after having played six matches. On his return to Fratton Park he went on to play 15 first team matches during the 2009–10 season.

Stoke City

On 1 February 2010, Begović signed a four-and-a-half-year contract at Stoke City for a fee of £3.25 million. Following the signing manager Tony Pulis revealed that he had been tracking Begović for a while. "We have been tracking Asmir for some time and we believe that potentially he is the best young keeper in the country". Begović had also held talks with Tottenham Hotspur prior to joining Stoke, but opted for the "Potters" due to "sporting reasons". He later revealed his relief at leaving Portsmouth following their financial turmoil during the 2009–10 season. Portsmouth ended up owing Tottenham money for Begović, despite him turning them down, as Tottenham had already paid Portsmouth an instalment on the transfer. Portsmouth were ordered to pay Tottenham £1 million by the Premier League over the aborted transfer as Spurs had already made an initial payment for both Begović and Younès Kaboul.

Begović made his debut for Stoke against Chelsea on 25 April 2010, replacing the injured Thomas Sørensen in the 35th minute, where he conceded five goals. He kept his first clean sheet for City in a 0–0 draw with Everton on 1 May 2010. He also played in the last two games of the 2009–10 season against Fulham and Manchester United.

At the start of the 2010–11 season Begović was handed the number one jersey by manager Tony Pulis. Begović allegedly refused to play in a League Cup match against Shrewsbury Town, a decision which Pulis said was "totally disrespectful". Begović on the other hand, denied that he had refused to play. Despite this Begović played his first match of the season in the next round of the League Cup against Fulham and then West Ham United. He made his first league appearance on 30 October against Everton replacing the injured Sørensen. Following this Begović took over from Sørensen as City's first choice 'keeper, he also 'made peace' with Tony Pulis with his absence from the Shrewsbury match. After a narrow defeat at Arsenal in February 2011 Begović believes that Stoke are developing well. The following week against West Ham, Begović made an error gifting a goal to Demba Ba. Begović missed out on an FA Cup Final with second choice 'keeper Sørensen being preferred to play in cup matches.

Begović started the 2011–12 season as first choice keeper and earned praise from Tony Pulis after he kept five clean sheets in six matches including a fine display against Liverpool on 11 September. However, Begović then conceded eighteen goals in the next seven matches, including a woeful 5–0 defeat by Bolton Wanderers a performance which led him to apologise to the supporters for his display. Following the Bolton match he was dropped in favour of Sørensen. Begović signed a new four-and-a-half year contract extension with Stoke in December 2011 keeping him at the club until 2016. He regained number 1 spot in March 2012. Begović continued as City's number one stopper in 2012–13 and began the season in fine form conceding just 12 goals in the opening 15 matches. Despite Stoke having a poor second half to the season, Begović remained in decent enough form and won the Player of the Year Award.

Begović remained first choice 'keeper going into the 2013–14 season under new manager Mark Hughes and produced a man of the match performance on the opening day against Liverpool. On 2 November 2013, Begović scored after 13 seconds against Southampton at a distance of 97.5 yards, after his long kick downfield deceived Artur Boruc. His goal against Southampton earned him a place in the 2015 Guinness World Records for the 'longest goal scored in football'.

Begović missed his first League match for almost two years at Newcastle United on 26 December after he broke his finger in a training session which ruled him out for five weeks. He returned to the starting line-up against Chelsea on 26 January 2014. Begović played 33 times for Stoke in 2013–14 as the team finished in 9th position.

Begović kept his 50th clean sheet for Stoke on 4 March 2015 in a 2–0 victory over Everton. Begović kept his place as number one keeper in 2014–15 playing in 36 matches as Stoke finished the season again in ninth position and they ended the campaign with a 6–1 victory against Liverpool. He was dropped by Mark Hughes for three matches in May after making a mistake against Sunderland. This prompted media speculation about his future at the club. Indeed, Begović departed the Britannia Stadium in July 2015, in total he spent five-and-a-half seasons at Stoke making 172 appearances.

Chelsea

On 13 July 2015, Chelsea signed Begović on a four-year deal for a fee of £8 million. As part of the deal Chelsea also offered midfielder Marco van Ginkel in part exchange to Stoke on loan for one season.

He made his debut nine days later on Chelsea's pre-season tour, coming on at half time for Thibaut Courtois with Chelsea 1–0 up against the New York Red Bulls, but the match ended in a 4-2 defeat. His first competitive fixture was the 2015 FA Community Shield on 2 August at Wembley Stadium, in which he was unused in a 1–0 loss to rivals Arsenal. Six days later he came on as a substitute for Oscar when Courtois was sent off for conceding a penalty with a foul on Bafétimbi Gomis, who converted it for a 2–2 draw. On 16 August, Begović made his first competitive start for Chelsea in a 3–0 away loss to Manchester City. A month later, he earned the first clean sheet of the season for Chelsea in a UEFA Champions League match against Maccabi Tel Aviv which ended in a 4–0 win for Chelsea. He kept a sequence of three clean sheets before Courtois returned to the team on 5 December.

In his second season with Chelsea, Begović didn't get much playing time, and there were speculations that he would leave the club in the winter transfer window. However, since Chelsea couldn't find a replacement for him, he was forced to stay at Stamford Bridge. In spite of featuring in only two league games, he received a winners' medal as Chelsea won the 2016–17 Premier League.

AFC Bournemouth
On 30 May 2017, Begović signed for Premier League club Bournemouth on a long-term contract for an undisclosed fee. He debuted on 12 August on the opening day of the new Premier League season, in a 0–1 loss against West Bromwich Albion. He kept his first clean sheet in the season on 30 September, in a 0–0 draw against Leicester City. On 31 January 2018, he played in a 3–0 win at his former club Chelsea. He played all 38 league games for the Cherries and manager Eddie Howe as being worth his £10 million fee.

After conceding 14 goals over four consecutive defeats, Begović was dropped for the first time in January 2019, for Artur Boruc. The Polish veteran then secured his place as Bournemouth's goalkeeper at Begović's expense.

On 2 September 2019, Begović was sent on a six-month loan to Qarabağ. He made his debut 13 days later, in a 2–0 victory against Neftçi in the Azerbaijan Premier League. He signed on loan for Serie A club AC Milan for the rest of the 2019–20 season on 13 January 2020. He played twice, first on 22 February in a 1–1 draw at Fiorentina, as a 52nd-minute replacement for the injured Gianluigi Donnarumma, then in a 2–1 home loss to Genoa on 8 March.

Begović made 45 Championship appearances for Bournemouth in the 2020–21 season, keeping 15 clean sheets.

Everton
On 20 July 2021, Begović joined Everton on an initial 12-month contract with an option for a further year. He made his debut on 24 August in the second round of the EFL Cup, a 2–1 win at Huddersfield Town. Second-choice to Jordan Pickford, he played three Premier League games in his first season, starting with a 3–0 loss at Aston Villa on 18 September.

International career

Canada
Begović was the starting goalkeeper for Canada in the 2007 FIFA U-20 World Cup. He made several difficult saves for his team in a 3–0 loss to Chile and let in one goal against Austria. Late in the third match of the tournament, after allowing two goals, Begović came out of his area to play a long ball from a Congo defender. The ball took a high bounce off the wet pitch, forcing him to use his hands to prevent it from going over his head. He was shown a straight red card, and midfielder Jonathan Beaulieu-Bourgault was forced to play in goal, as Canada had used up its three substitutes.

On 14 August 2007, 20-year-old Begović received his first call-up to the senior Canada squad for the friendly match with Iceland, but didn't see any action on the pitch. In November 2008, he accepted another call for Canada's 2010 FIFA World Cup qualifier versus Jamaica, but again didn't get any playing time as Lars Hirschfeld was the preferred option in goal.

Players with dual nationality, like Begović, who had already played for a country's national team at youth level, were not allowed to switch nationalities after they turned 21, but on 3 June 2009 FIFA removed the age limit. In late June 2009, he spoke with Bosnian head coach Miroslav Blažević about the possibility of making his debut for Bosnia and Herzegovina. Quotes in the Bosnian media seemed to indicate Begović's intent to play for the country of his birth. Begović missed the 2009 CONCACAF Gold Cup for Canada saying Portsmouth wanted him to spend the whole pre-season with the club. On 12 July 2009 on Full-Time: Vancouver's Soccer Show on the TEAM 1040 radio in Canada he indicated his desire to continue with the Canadian national team. He suggested that comments he had made to Bosnia's head coach had been misinterpreted due to poor translation. In the same interview, Begović also said:

Bosnia and Herzegovina

However, less than two months later, Begović changed his mind and on 21 August 2009 accepted a call-up for two Bosnia 2010 World Cup qualifiers: away at Armenia on 5 September 2009, and four days later versus Turkey at home in Zenica. During the pre-match preparations, Begović gave an interview to the Bosnian web portal, stating among other things:

He did not play in either match. However, his debut for the national team finally came in the next qualifier against Estonia. He came on to replace Kenan Hasagić in the 92nd minute of the match, in which Bosnia won the match with a final score of 2–0.

On 3 March 2010, he played a significant role in a match for the first time as he got to play the second half in Bosnia's friendly match against Ghana. Bosnia won the match 2–1 and Begović didn't concede any goals. He received his first full cap against Sweden in May 2010. Bosnia lost the match 4–2, but Begović was not responsible for any of the goals according to the Bosnian media, as they blamed Bosnia's defense for the goals. He caused controversy after he pulled out of Bosnia's friendlies against Slovakia and Mexico.

In August 2012, Begović became first-choice goalkeeper for the national team. On 27 May 2013, Begović has been voted the 2012 Bosnian Footballer of the Year by the Bosnian Sport Writers' Jury. On 16 October 2013 Bosnia defeated Lithuania 1–0 to qualify for the 2014 FIFA World Cup, their first major tournament.

In June 2014, he was named in Bosnia and Herzegovina's squad for the 2014 FIFA World Cup, where he played full 90 minutes in all three matches.

Personal life
On 18 June 2011, Begović married his American-born wife, Nicolle Howard, with whom he has two daughters, Taylor and Blair Rose Begović. In April 2011 he joined FC Edmonton's charity 'Kicks for Kids Program'.

Begović was born in Bosnia and Herzegovina while it was part of the SFR Yugoslavia, and moved to Germany at the age of four. Growing up in Germany, Begović supported Bayern Munich and cites goalkeeping great Oliver Kahn as his inspiration. He also attended matches at his local club VfB Stuttgart. Along with his native Bosnian, Begović is fluent in three additional languages: German, English and French. In October 2013 he set up his own charity, the Asmir Begović Foundation.

Begović's younger brother Denis plays for Bristol City's Under 18s as a goalkeeper.

In April 2020, Begović played a football video game against fellow professional Alphonso Davies – who also came to Canada as a child refugee – to raise funds for the United Nations High Commissioner for Refugees.

Career statistics

Club

International

Honours
Chelsea
Premier League: 2016–17
FA Cup runner-up: 2016–17

Qarabağ FK
Azerbaijan Premier League: 2019–20

Canada U23
CONCACAF Men's Pre-Olympic Tournament third place: 2008

Individual
Bosnian Footballer of the Year: 2012
Canadian U–20 Player of the Year: 2007

See also
List of goalscoring goalkeepers

References

External links

Profile at the Everton F.C. website

1987 births
Living people
People from Trebinje
Bosniaks of Bosnia and Herzegovina
Yugoslav Wars refugees
Bosnia and Herzegovina refugees
Bosnia and Herzegovina emigrants to Germany
Bosnia and Herzegovina emigrants to Canada
Canadian people of Bosnia and Herzegovina descent
Canadian Muslims
Naturalized citizens of Canada
Association football goalkeepers
Soccer players from Edmonton
Canadian soccer players
Canada men's youth international soccer players
Bosnia and Herzegovina footballers
Bosnia and Herzegovina international footballers
2014 FIFA World Cup players
Portsmouth F.C. players
R.A.A. Louviéroise players
Macclesfield Town F.C. players
AFC Bournemouth players
Yeovil Town F.C. players
Ipswich Town F.C. players
Stoke City F.C. players
Chelsea F.C. players
Qarabağ FK players
A.C. Milan players
Everton F.C. players
English Football League players
Belgian Pro League players
Premier League players
Azerbaijan Premier League players
Serie A players
Bosnia and Herzegovina expatriate footballers
Canadian expatriate soccer players
Expatriate footballers in Belgium
Bosnia and Herzegovina expatriate sportspeople in Belgium
Canadian expatriate sportspeople in Belgium
Expatriate footballers in England
Bosnia and Herzegovina expatriate sportspeople in England
Canadian expatriate sportspeople in England
Expatriate footballers in Azerbaijan
Bosnia and Herzegovina expatriate sportspeople in Azerbaijan
Expatriate footballers in Italy
Bosnia and Herzegovina expatriate sportspeople in Italy
Canadian expatriate sportspeople in Italy